Twombly Ridge is an unorganized territory (township) located in Penobscot County, Maine, United States. At the 2020 census, the unorganized territory had a total population of 0.

Geography 
According to the United States Census Bureau, the unorganized territory has a total area of 45.1 square miles (116.8 km2), of which 43.9 square miles (113.7 km2) is land and 1.2 square miles (3.2 km2) is water. The total area is 2.70% water.

Demographics 

As of the 2010 Census, there were no people living in the territory.

References

Unorganized territories in Maine
Populated places in Penobscot County, Maine